Kothaligad (also called Kotligad/ Kothligad/Peth) is a small fort (3100 ft) situated to the east of Karjat near Karjat-Murbad Road in the Indian state of Maharashtra. It is a famous trek in the Karjat area, because of its small height and easy climbing. It is also known as the Fort of Peth because of its vicinity to Peth village at its base.

How to Reach - 

Nearest station is Karjat from there 

Karjat railway station - Karjat bus depot - catch bus for Ambivali village ( bus name - solangaon Or Jamrug) - reach the top

Also private vehicle are also available (auto Or tum tum) with around 400-600 rupees

Features
There is a small temple and large cave at the base and a chimney like tunnel to the top of the fort. This pinnacle is carved from inside forming a staircase reaching the top.
There is a tank of water (rock cut water cistern) at some distance from the cave and another one at the top of the fort.
The stone is a single black expanse reaching till the Peth village standing on the fertile soil with abundant natural resources for water and farming.

History
The cave and the temple carvings date back to the 13th century. Not much is known about the history until the 18th century. In 1684 Aurangjeb sent Abdul Kadir and AlaiBiradkar to capture this fort. After a small skirmish, the fort was captured by Abdul Kadir. Aurangjeb honored Abdul Kadir and renamed this fort as Miftah-ul-Fateh (Key to success). Many attempts were made later to win this fort by the Maratha Army, but they were not successful. In 1716, this cave was captured by the British. On 2 November 1817, it was recaptured by the Marathas under the leadership of Bapurao who was general of Bajirao Peshwa. The fort was recaptured by the British on 30 December 1817, by Captain Brooks. The British had the fort till 1862 as an outpost for vigilance on the surrounding valley and the hills all around it.

The locals say that this is not actually a fort but a sort of lighthouse from where the directions were given to know the advancements of the enemy. In fact, it can be called a watch tower to keep a vigil on the Mawal area in the greater province of the Maratha.

Image gallery

See also
List of forts in Maharashtra
 Marathi People
 List of Maratha dynasties and states
 Maratha War of Independence
 Battles involving the Maratha Empire
 Maratha Army
 Maratha titles
 Military history of India
 List of people involved in the Maratha Empire

References

External links
Click here  to see its photosphere of the peak of the Kothaligad fort.

Buildings and structures of the Maratha Empire
Forts in Raigad district
16th-century forts in India
Caves of Maharashtra
Tourist attractions in Pune district
Indian rock-cut architecture
Former populated places in India
Hiking trails in India

Hiking